Matsuya is a Japanese surname. Notable people with the surname include:

 Midori Matsuya (1943–1994), Japanese pianist
 Minoru Matsuya (1910–1995), Japanese jazz pianist

Fictional characters 
 Taki Matsuya, Marvel Comics character
 Misaki Matsuya, a character in the manga Excel Saga

Japanese-language surnames